Hak-e Olya (also Romanized as Ḩak-e ‘Olyā and Ḩakk-e ‘Olyā; also known as Ḩak-e Bālā, Hak-i-Bāla, Ḩakk-e Bālā, and Ḩakke-e Bālā) is a village in Pol-e Doab Rural District, Zalian District, Shazand County, Markazi Province, Iran. At the 2006 census, its population was 373, in 99 families.

References 

Populated places in Shazand County